Achilo is a genus of moths of the family Crambidae. It contains only one species, Achilo lignella, which is found in Venezuela.

References

Haimbachiini
Monotypic moth genera
Moths of South America
Taxa named by Hans Georg Amsel
Crambidae genera